I'm All Yours Baby! is a studio album by Ray Charles released in 1969 on Charles' Tangerine Records label.

Track listing
LP side A: 
 "Yours" (Jack Sherr) – 4:00 
 "I Didn't Know What Time It Was" (Richard Rodgers, Lorenz Hart) – 4:58 
 "Love Is Here to Stay" (Ira Gershwin, George Gershwin) – 3:17 
 "Memories of You" (Andy Razaf, Eubie Blake) – 4:25 
 "Till the End of Time" (Buddy Kaye, Ted Mossman) – 2:39 
LP side B:
 "I Had the Craziest Dream" (Harry Warren, Mack Gordon) – 4:19 
 "Someday" (Brian Hooker, Rudolf Friml) – 4:46 
 "Indian Love Call" (Oscar Hammerstein II, Otto Harbach, Rudolf Friml) – 4:31 
 "I Dream of You (More Than You Dream I Do)" (Edna Osser, Marjorie Goetschius) – 3:18 
 "Gloomy Sunday" (Rezső Seress, Sam M. Lewis) – 3:52

Personnel
Ray Charles – keyboards, vocals
Sid Feller - arrangements
Technical
Mark Taylor - engineer
Daniel Pezza, Henry Epstein - design, cover

References
Tangerine / ABC 675
I’m All Yours Baby! at discogs.com

Ray Charles albums
1969 albums
Albums arranged by Sid Feller
ABC Records albums
Tangerine Records (1962) albums